Roman 1987 is a 1987 novel by Norwegian author Dag Solstad. It won the Nordic Council's Literature Prize in 1989.

References

1989 novels
20th-century Norwegian novels
Norwegian-language novels
Nordic Council's Literature Prize-winning works